Fernando Salazar Lomelí (born 13 July 1979) is a Mexican former footballer who played as a defender.

Honours
Pachuca
Mexican Primera División: Clausura 2006, Clausura 2007
CONCACAF Champions' Cup: 2007, 2008
Copa Sudamericana: 2006
North American SuperLiga: 2007

León
Liga de Ascenso: Clausura 2012

Mexico
CONCACAF Gold Cup: 2003

Individual
CONCACAF Gold Cup Best XI (Reserves): 2003

External links
 

1979 births
Living people
CONCACAF Gold Cup-winning players
Atlas F.C. footballers
Deportivo Toluca F.C. players
C.F. Pachuca players
Atlético Morelia players
Club León footballers
Liga MX players
Association football defenders
Footballers from Guadalajara, Jalisco
2003 CONCACAF Gold Cup players
Mexican footballers
Mexico international footballers